Belgium was represented by Ann Christy, with the song "Gelukkig zijn", at the 1975 Eurovision Song Contest, which took place on 22 March in Stockholm. Christy was the winner of the Belgian national final for the contest, held on 1 March; she had previously taken part in the Belgian preselections of 1970, 1971 and 1973. Future Belgian representative Micha Marah (1979) also took part.

Before Eurovision

Eurosong 
The first stage of the selection process consisted of seven semi-finals at the Amerikaans Theater in Brussels, taking part between 17 November 1974 and 16 February 1975, hosted by Staf Van Berendoncks. 30 participating songs have been identified but it is believed that there were many more, possibly up to 70. The qualifiers were chosen by 5 regional juries

Final 
The final, consisting of ten songs, took place on 1 March 1975 also at the Amerikaans Theater, hosted by Staf Van Berendoncks. Six singers were involved, with four (including Christy) performing two songs apiece. Voting was by 5 regional juries and "Gelukkig zijn" emerged the winner by a margin of almost 60 points.

At Eurovision 
On the night of the final Christy performed 11th in the running order, following Israel and preceding Malta. Under the free-language rule in operation at the time, Christy performed the first half of the song in Dutch, before switching to English. At the close of the voting "Gelukkig zijn" had received 17 points, placing Belgium 15th of the 19 participating countries.

Voting

References 

1975
Countries in the Eurovision Song Contest 1975
Eurovision